Rafting is traveling by raft.

Rafting may also refer to:

Rafting event, in the context of biological migrations
Timber rafting, log transportation method
Ice rafting, transport of various material by ice
Finger rafting,  overlapping of two ice sheets